The 1918 Colorado Silver and Gold football team was an American football team that represented the University of Colorado as a member of the Rocky Mountain Conference (RMC) during the 1918 college football season. Led by first-year head coach Enoch J. Mills, Colorado compiled an overall record of 2–3 with a mark of 1–2 in conference play, trying for third place in the RMC.

Schedule

References

Colorado
Colorado Buffaloes football seasons
Colorado Silver and Gold football